The Ford Del Rey is a midsized car produced by Ford do Brasil in Brazil from 1981 to 1991. It was a successor to the popular Ford Corcel II. Like the Corcel II, the Del Rey was designed exclusively for Brazil, but was sold in Chile, Venezuela, Uruguay, and Paraguay, as well.  

The Del Rey was offered as a two-door coupé, four-door sedan, or three-door station wagon. A two-door convertible prototype was also shown in 1982, but never entered production. The vehicle was offered in many models, originally as the Prata (silver) and Ouro (gold) as basic and top-of-the-line versions between 1981 and 1984. Between 1985 and 1991, the versions (from most basic to top) were L, GL, GLX, and Ghia. It was offered with two engines, a CHT 1.6-L inline four and a VW-developed 1.8-L inline four, both which were fueled by gasoline or ethanol. The transmissions were a standard five-speed manual and an optional three-speed automatic. The Del Rey was replaced by the Ford Versailles in 1991, which was based on the Volkswagen Santana, built in an association between Ford and VW called Autolatina.

References

 .

External links

Del Rey
Mid-size cars
Front-wheel-drive vehicles
Cars of Brazil
Cars introduced in 1981
Cars discontinued in 1991
1990s cars